Zeta Mensae, Latinized from ζ Mensae, is a solitary, white-hued star in the southern constellation of Mensa. It is faintly visible to the naked eye, having an apparent visual magnitude of +5.64. At that distance, the visual magnitude is diminished by an extinction factor of 0.088 due to interstellar dust. Eggen (1995) listed it as a proper motion candidate for membership in the IC 2391 supercluster.

The stellar classification of A5 III suggests this is an A-type giant star. It is spinning rapidly, showing a projected rotational velocity of 200 km/s, giving the star an oblate shape with an equatorial bulge that is an estimated 26% larger than the polar radius. The star is radiating about 69 times the Sun's luminosity from its photosphere at an effective temperature of around 7,555 K. It displays a faint infrared excess at a wavelength of 18μm, indicating that it is being orbited by a debris disk.

References

A-type giants
Circumstellar disks

Mensa (constellation)
Mensae, Zeta
PD-80 00196
050506
031897
2559